Alpine Canada is the national governing body for alpine ski racing, para-alpine and ski cross in Canada. Alpine Canada represents coaches, officials, supporters and athletes, including the racers of the Canadian Alpine Ski Team, Canadian Ski Cross Team and the Canadian Para-Alpine Ski Team. Alpine Canada is also involved in promoting participation within Canada's four million recreational skiers.

Organization
Alpine Canada Alpin was registered with Canadian Revenue Agency as a Canadian amateur athletic association (RCAAA); therefore, they can issue official donation receipts and are eligible to receive gifts from registered charities since 1992-04-01.

Canadian Alpine Ski Team
The Canadian Alpine Ski Team comprises athletes whose focus is to compete at the World Cup, World Championship and Olympic levels. Both men and women operate as separate national teams each with respective coaching staff.

Athletes on the team compete in a range of disciplines, some competing in technical, some in speed, and a few in both. Alpine Canada's rich history of champions dates back to the 1950s, as athletes on today's teams continue to chase the podium. To date, Canadian alpine athletes have earned more than 90 world cup, world championship and Olympic medals.

Alpine skier Allison Forsyth competed for Canada at the 2002 Olympic Winter Games. She was sexually abused by Alpine Canada coach Bertrand Charest in 1997 and 1998. He was found guilty in 2017 of 37 sex-related charges noted in complaints of nine women who were teenagers at the times of the crimes, was sentenced to 12 years in prison, and was released on parole in 2019.

Canadian Para-Alpine Ski Team
The Para-Alpine ski team comprises both female and male athletes in three main classification categories: visually impaired, standing and sitting. Para-alpine athletes compete in five core disciplines, (Slalom, Giant Slalom, Super-G, and Downhill). Para-alpine skiing is governed by the International Paralympic Committee (IPC) through the International Paralympic Alpine Skiing Committee (IPCAS).

Canada is known as a dominating team on the international stage in all categories, and the team continues to collect medals and do our country proud at World Cups, World Championships and Paralympic Games.

Canadian Ski Cross Team 
The Canadian Ski Cross Team is the newest addition to the Alpine Canada family joining the organization in 2010. The Canadian Ski Cross Team is made up of men and women who compete in heats. Four athletes race head to head down the course, with the top two from each heat advancing to the next round.

Canada has some of the sport's biggest stars and continues to develop athletes who are able to compete with the best in the world. As a team that does not shy away from the podium at every level, the Canadians have established themselves as arguably the best ski cross nation in the world.

See also

 Canadian Alpine Ski Championships
 Crazy Canucks
 Canadian Snowboard Federation, Canadian snowboard sports federation
 Canadian Freestyle Ski Association, Canadian freestyle skiing sports federation
 Nordic Combined Ski Canada, Canadian Nordic combined skiing sports federation
 Ski Jumping Canada, Canadian ski jumping sports federation
 Cross Country Canada, Canadian cross country skiing sports federation
 Biathlon Canada, Canadian biathlon ski-shooting sports federation

References

External links
 - Alpine Canada

Alpine skiing in Canada
Alpine skiing organizations
Sports governing bodies in Canada